Morovis National Cemetery is a United States National Cemetery located in the municipality of Morovis, in the Commonwealth of Puerto Rico. It encompasses  of land, and was dedicated in December 2020. This cemetery along with the Puerto Rico National Cemetery located in Bayamón, are the only United States National Cemeteries located outside of the United States.

The Morovis National Cemetery was built to be operational before the cemetery in Bayamón reached full capacity.

History
The Morovis National Cemetery was built in Morovis within a 247.5-acre parcel of land that can be accessed from Highway 137 at Km. 11.2. It was built to replace the existing Puerto Rico National Cemetery located in Bayamón, which would reach its capacity in 2022. It and the cemetery in Bayamón are the only two cemeteries in the United States National Cemetery System located outside the U.S.

The land for the cemetery was purchased by the United States Department of Veterans Affairs in 2013 for $7.6 million.

Construction was underway in 2019 with interments slated to begin in 2021. The U.S. Department of Veterans Affairs (VA) held a dedication ceremony for the cemetery on December 12, 2020.

Notable interments
The following list has the names of distinguished Puerto Ricans, and non-Puerto Rican veterans who have made Puerto Rico their home, who served in the US military and are interred there.

See also
 List of Puerto Ricans
 List of Puerto Rican military personnel

References

Further reading
  Greg Boudonck. Puertorriquenos Who Served With Guts, Glory, and Honor. Fighting to Defend a Nation Not Completely Their Own. 
 Hector Andres Negroni. Historia militar de Puerto Rico. Sociedad Estatal Quinto Centenario (1992).

External links
 Veterans Cemetery in Aguadilla, Puerto Rico
 Puerto Rico National Cemetery
 

Cemeteries in Puerto Rico
Military in Puerto Rico
United States national cemeteries